ORP Rolnik was a Polish Navy missile . Built in Rybinsk for the Soviet Navy as R-833, the ship was acquired by Poland in 1989 and served until 2013.

Description 
Internationally, the ship was classified as a small corvette, while in Poland it was referred to as a missile ship. It was powered by two gas turbines with a maximum horsepower of 12,000 HP, allowing it to reach speeds of over 43 knots. Rolnik's primary armament was for ship-to-ship combat, and its primary weapon was the P-21/P-22 anti-ship missile. The ship lacked airborne detection radar, and had minimal anti-aircraft capabilities. It had a crew of 45 officers and sailors.

Radar equipment 

 Garpun-E target acquisition radar (NATO: "Plank Shave")
 MR-123 fire control radar (NATO: "Bass Tilt")
 Pechora-1 navigational radar

Armament 

 Nichrom-RR recognition system
 P-21/P-22 anti-ship missiles

History 

The success of the Osa-class missile boats caused the Soviet Union to begin looking for a successor class to replace the aging ships. Development of the Tarantul I-class corvettes began in 1965, with an assumption that the new ships would be 400-500 tons and carry a new missile system. After planning was completed by CKMB Almaz, construction began on Rolnik in 1969. The ship was built in the Rybinsk Shipyard under the yard number 01722 and the designation R-833.

After several decades of service within the Soviet Navy, the boat was purchased by Poland in 1989. Upon commissioning into the Polish Navy on 4 February 1989,  Rolnik was assigned to a new independent group of missile ships. Later, the ship was reassigned to the 2nd Missile and Torpedo Boat Squadron of the 3rd Ship Flotilla. In 2004, the ship was moved to the Missile Ships Squadron, and then to its final assignment in the Battle Ships Squadron.

From 1989 to 2009, Rolnik launched thirty-two rockets and travelled a total of fifty thousand miles. It participated in several international exercises in the Baltic Sea, including BALTOPS and PASSEX. The ship was decommissioned at the Naval Port in Gdynia on 3 December 2013.

References 

Corvettes of the Polish Navy
1989 ships
Tarantul-class corvettes
Ships built in the Soviet Union